Ian Strachan (born 1 November 1940) was a Canadian politician. He represented the electoral district of Eagle River in the Newfoundland and Labrador House of Assembly from 1975 to 1979. He was a member of the Liberal Party. He was born at Aberdeen, Scotland.

Strachan previously worked as a Community Development Worker for Memorial University of Newfoundland Extension Services in Nain. He subsequently served as independent facilitator chair of the Combined Councils of Labrador.

References

1940 births
Living people
Liberal Party of Newfoundland and Labrador MHAs
Politicians from Aberdeen
Scottish emigrants to Canada
People from Labrador